Germany–Lithuania relations are diplomatic relations between Germany and Lithuania. Bilateral relations existed from 1918 to 1944 and again since 1991. Both countries are members of the Council of the Baltic Sea States, the Organization for Security and Cooperation in Europe (OSCE), the Council of Europe, NATO and the European Union, as well as the Schengen area. Lithuania has also been part of the Eurozone since 2015. The relation is described as close and reliable partnership.

History 
The name Lithuania (as Litua) first appears in written sources in 1009 in the Quedlinburg Annals in connection with the monk Bruno of Querfurt, who wanted to convert the local people to Christianity. Western powers considered the Baltic Lithuanians as the last stronghold of European paganism, potential missionary territory of the Church and expansion territory of the Livonian and Prussian knightly nobility. However, the Lithuanians were able to successfully assert themselves against the advance of the Teutonic Order in Livonia and Prussia. This self-assertion of the Lithuanians is an important reason for the different development of the German settlements in Lithuania compared to the Baltic Germans in Estonia and Latvia: while the Baltic Germans immigrated in the course of the conquests of the Teutonic Order in the 13th and 14th centuries and formed a leading class, the Lithuanian Germans came to the country only later and formed an often rather peasant ethnic group.

From 1385, the great power Lithuania entered into a personal union with the Kingdom of Poland. In the Battle of Tannenberg (1410), the union defeated the Teutonic Order. The union with Poland was consolidated in 1568 in the Union of Lublin. Therefore, until the end of the Poland-Lithuania state, there is a largely common history also in the relations with the German states. Thus, in the Peace of Oliva, Poland-Lithuania had to cede, among other things, the Duchy of Prussia to Brandenburg. The continuing internal and external decline of the state led to Lithuania (and Poland) disappearing from the map in 1795 after several partitions - undertaken by the neighboring states of Russia, Austria and Prussia - with Lithuania being annexed to the Russian Empire. In the 19th century, with the rise of nationalism in Europe, Lithuanian culture was increasingly threatened by Russification. Cultural contact with the Lithuanians living in East Prussia (the territory of Lithuania Minor) could help against this, as they were less restricted in the practice of their culture. Thus, book bearers smuggled Lithuanian books printed in Latin script (which were forbidden in the Tsarist Empire at that time) across the East Prussian-Russian border at great risk.

During World War I, Germany, as an adversary of Russia, occupied Lithuania and some neighboring territories in 1915 and combined them into the administrative unit of Ober Ost. Towards the end of the World War, Lithuania's formal independence, but practically as a satellite of the German Empire, was sought as a kingdom under Mindaugas II. Germany wanted to recognize Lithuania as a sovereign state only if it entered into economic and military union with the Reich. On December 11, 1917, the Taryba declared the restoration of the "independent" state of Lithuania with Vilnius as its capital and with ties to the German Empire. Since Germany delayed recognition, on February 16, 1918, the Taryba again proclaimed Lithuania's independence without any ties to the other states. This day remains a national holiday to this day. Subsequently, Lithuanians were able to stabilize the independence of their state. In 1923 Lithuania annexed the Memelland, i.e. the part of East Prussia north of the Memel River, formerly part of the German Empire, with the port city of Memel (today Klaipėda), which had been administered by the League of Nations since the end of the War. In 1924, this annexation was recognized by the previous protecting powers. Apart from the problem of the Memelland, German-Lithuanian relations in the interwar period developed quite positively to some extent, the two states being bound together by their dislike of Poland, to which both had territorial claims.

After the Nazi takeover in March 1933, tensions began to rise again, reaching a climax in February 1934, when the Lithuanian government arrested dozens of pro-Nazi activists. In March 1939, Lithuania had to bow to German pressure and cede the Memel region back to Germany after the 1939 German ultimatum to Lithuania. In the Hitler-Stalin Pact, Lithuania had initially been assigned to the German sphere of influence. After the outbreak of World War II, however, there was a revision of this treaty by the German-Soviet Border and Friendship Treaty with a change in the spheres of influence. Germany received parts of eastern Poland. Lithuania was awarded to the Soviet Union. On June 15, 1940, the Red Army entered Lithuania and established the Lithuanian SSR on July 21, 1940. As late as 1941, many Lithuanian Germans were resettled in the German sphere of influence. From 1941 to 1945, Lithuania was occupied by the Wehrmacht as part of the Nazi war of aggression against the Soviet Union and belonged to the Reichskommissariat Ostland. During this period, Germans and Lithuanian collaborators committed crimes against humanity against opposition members and minorities. Lithuanian Jews fell victim to the Holocaust and 95% of them didn't survive the war. In Lithuania, attempts were made to implement the so-called Kegelbahn project, i.e. the targeted settlement of certain conquered territories with German resettlers. From 1944 on, most of the Germans fled from the reapproaching Red Army or were expelled soon after. Thousands of Lithuanians fled with the Germans to the West. For the exiled Lithuanians who settled in West Germany, the Lithuanian grammar school in Hüttenfeld in southern Hesse formed a cultural preservation center. Expelled Lithuanian-Germans united in 1951 in the Landsmannschaft der Deutschen aus Litauen (Association of Germans from Lithuania).

Due to the annexation of Lithuania by the USSR after the war, the associated end of state sovereignty and freedom of action, as well as the system opposition between the Soviet Union and the Federal Republic of Germany, (West) German-Lithuanian contacts were only possible to a very limited extent during the Cold War. In the course of the perestroika initiated by Mikhail Gorbachev in 1986, the declaration of independence was adopted in Lithuania after free elections on March 11, 1990. On August 27, 1991, Estonia, Latvia and Lithuania were recognized by the EC states and thus also by Germany (out of consideration for the Soviet Union only after the latter had recognized the independence of the Baltic states). In the following period, Germany's policy towards Lithuania oscillated between the desire and obligation to integrate the Baltic states into European institutions and the fear of thereby angering Russia or disrupting its rapprochement with Europe. At times, Germany was even considered the "biggest brakeman" among the Western powers with regard to NATO accession. In 2004, Lithuania achieved its foreign policy strategic goal and joined the EU and NATO. Today, German-Lithuanian relations are intensive and friendly and continue to develop both bilaterally and multilaterally within the framework of the aforementioned organizations.

Economic exchange 
For Lithuania, Germany is one of the most important trade and investment partners. In 2021, the value of German imported goods from Lithiania was 2.8 billion Euro. German exports to Lithuania amounted to 4.3 billion euros. Both countries trade mainly industrial goods.

Migration 
In 2021, over 54,000 Lithuanian citizens lived in Germany, making Germany the most important destination for Lithuanian immigrants within the EU. Historically, a large Baltic German minority lived in Lithuania, most of which was expelled after the Soviet annexation. According to the 2021 census, just under 2000 Germans still lived in Lithuania.

Diplomatic locations 
 Germany has an embassy in Vilnius.
 Lithuania has an embassy in Berlin.

References 

 
Lithuania
Bilateral relations of Lithuania